Eugenio de Ochoa (1815–72) was a Spanish author, writer, and translator.

References
Richard Eugene Chandler and Kessel Schwartz. A New History of Spanish Literature. Louisiana State University Press, 1991. ; pp. 337–338

External links
 
 

1815 births
1872 deaths
Members of the Royal Spanish Academy
Spanish translators
Latin–Spanish translators
French–Spanish translators
19th-century Spanish writers
19th-century male writers
19th-century translators